RUS Aviation was an all cargo airline based in Sharjah, United Arab Emirates. It operated scheduled and charter cargo flights. Its main base was Sharjah International Airport.
RUS Aviation was one of the biggest IL76 & AN12 operator/supplier within UAE and the region. With a fleet of more than 28 freighters of Airbus, Antonov, Boeing

It provided the following services: Cargo Consolidation, Air Charter in UAE, Ground Handling, Flight Planning, Landing Permits, Fuelling.

A RUS Aviation Il-76 featured in a 2010 episode of Top Gear, landing in Erbil, Iraq. Registration EK-76808.

The carrier ended operations in 2015.

Destinations 
RUS Aviation operated freight services to the following destinations (at April 2014):
Afghanistan
Kabul - Kabul International Airport
Kandahar - Kandahar International Airport
Djibouti
Djibouti City - Djibouti–Ambouli International Airport
Iraq
Baghdad - Baghdad International Airport
Basra - Basra Airport
Erbil - Erbil International Airport
Sulaimaniyah - Sulaimaniyah International Airport
Kyrgyzstan
Bishkek - Manas International Airport
Tajikistan
Dushanbe - Dushanbe Airport
United Arab Emirates
Sharjah - Sharjah International Airport Base

Fleet 

The RUS Aviation fleet consisted of the following aircraft (at April 2014):

External links 
 RUS Aviation

References

Defunct airlines of the United Arab Emirates
Airlines established in 1999
Airlines disestablished in 2015
Emirati companies established in 1999